Sineqan (also Romanized as Sīneqān; also known as Sināghūn, Sīnehqān, and Singhan) is a village in Hastijan Rural District, in the Central District of Delijan County, Markazi Province, Iran. At the 2006 census, its population was 298, in 136 families.

References

Populated places in Delijan County